Cristín Eugenio Cibils González (born 13 March 1956) is a former football defender.

Career
Cibils started his career at the youth divisions of Atlético Juventud of his hometown Loma Pytá. He then moved to Olimpia where he spent several years in the reserve and as usually came in as a substitute. Cibils was then transferred to Tembetary where he spent his best years as he was called up to the Paraguay national football team and was part of the squad that won the Copa América 1979. In 1980, he had a brief spell with Cerro Porteño where the club finished in second place in the Paraguayan league. After a few years in Guaraní he was loaned to La Serena of Chile. In 1985, he returned to Olimpia, but his position was well covered by players such as Rogelio Delgado and Gustavo Benítez so Cibils had very limited playing time which made him leave the club to Boquerón and Atlético Juventud where he finished his career in 1989.

Titles

References

1956 births
Living people
Paraguayan footballers
Paraguayan expatriate footballers
Paraguay international footballers
Copa América-winning players
1979 Copa América players
Club Olimpia footballers
Club Guaraní players
Cerro Porteño players
Deportes La Serena footballers
Chilean Primera División players
Expatriate footballers in Chile
Paraguayan expatriate sportspeople in Chile
Association football defenders